WPJY (88.7 FM) is a radio station licensed to Blennerhassett, West Virginia, United States. It is one of the 7 "WALK FM" network of stations. The station is currently owned by Positive Alternative Radio Inc.

History
The station went on the air as WPJY on 1998-10-06.  on 2005-12-12, the station changed its call sign to the current WPJY.

References

External links

PJY